Karl Reidar Lunde (23 April 1911 – 19 September 1982) was a Norwegian newspaper editor.

He was born in Oslo and took the cand.jur. degree in 1934. He was hired in Aftenposten in 1935. Here he was promoted to news editor in 1964 and editor-in-chief in 1970. He retired in 1978.

References 

1911 births
1982 deaths
Writers from Oslo
Norwegian newspaper editors
Aftenposten editors
20th-century Norwegian writers